"The Red Shoes" (Danish: De røde sko) is a literary fairy tale by Danish poet and author Hans Christian Andersen first published by C.A. Reitzel in Copenhagen 7 April  1845 in New Fairy Tales. First Volume. Third Collection (Nye Eventyr. Første Bind. Tredie Samling). Other tales in the volume include "The Elf Mound" (Elverhøi), "The Jumpers" (Springfyrene), "The Shepherdess and the Chimney Sweep" (Hyrdinden og Skorstensfejeren), and "Holger Danske" (Holger Danske).

The tale was republished 18 December 1849 as a part of Fairy Tales. 1850. (Eventyr. 1850.) and again on 30 March 1863 as a part of Fairy Tales and Stories. Second Volume. 1863. (Eventyr og Historier. Andet Bind. 1863.). The story is about a girl forced to dance continually in her red shoes. "The Red Shoes" has seen adaptations in various media including film.

Plot summary
A peasant girl named Karen is adopted while still very young, by a rich old lady after her mother's death and, as such, grows up vain and spoiled. Before her adoption, Karen had a roughly-made pair of red shoes; after, she has her adoptive mother buy her a pair of red shoes fit for a princess. Karen is so enamoured of her new shoes that she wears them to church, but the old lady tells her, "This is highly improper: you must only wear black shoes in church". But the following Sunday, Karen is unable to resist putting the red shoes on again. As she is about to enter the church, she meets a mysterious old soldier with a red beard. "Oh, what beautiful shoes for dancing," the soldier says. "Never come off when you dance," he tells the shoes, and he taps each of the shoes with his hand. After church, Karen cannot resist taking a few dance steps, and off she goes, as though the shoes controlled her, but she finally manages to stop them after a few minutes.

After her adoptive mother becomes ill and passes away, Karen doesn't attend her funeral, choosing to go to a dance instead. Once again her shoes take control and this time she is unable to stop dancing. An angel appears to her, bearing a sword, and condemns her to dance even after she dies, as a warning to vain children everywhere. Karen begs for mercy but the red shoes take her away before she hears the angel's reply.

Karen finds an executioner and asks him to chop off her feet. He does so but the shoes continue to dance, even with Karen's amputated feet inside them. The executioner gives her a pair of wooden feet and crutches. Thinking that she has suffered enough for the red shoes, Karen decides to go to church so people can see her. Yet her amputated feet, still in the red shoes, dance before her, barring the way. The following Sunday she tries again, thinking she is at least as good as the others in church, but again the dancing red shoes bar the way.

When Sunday comes again Karen dares not go to church. Instead she sits alone at home and prays to God for help. The angel reappears, now bearing a spray of roses, and gives Karen the mercy she asked for: her heart becomes so filled with peace and joy that it bursts. Her soul flies on to Heaven, where no one mentions the red shoes.

Background
Andersen named the story's anti-heroine Karen after his own loathed half-sister, Karen Marie Andersen. The story is based on an incident Andersen witnessed as a small child. His father, who was a shoemaker, was sent a piece of red silk by a rich lady to make a pair of dancing slippers for her own daughter. Using some valuable red leather along with the silk, he carefully created a pair of shoes only for the rich customer to tell him they were awful. She said he had 'done nothing but spoil [her] silk'. To which his father replied, "In that case, I may as well spoil my leather too," and he cut up the shoes in front of her.

Adaptations
 The Red Shoes is a 1948 British feature film about ballet based on the fairy tale.
 While living in Denmark in 1965, American jazz saxophonist Sahib Shihab composed the score to a jazz ballet based on Anderson's story.
 Tale Spinners for Children adapted the story as an audio drama (United Artist Records 11063), changing some details of the story: Karen takes dancing lessons and schemes to be given the lead role in a recital before the Queen, rehearsing even though her benefactress has become gravely ill.  Choosing to dance at the recital as her benefactress dies, the red dancing shoes made especially for her become permanently attached to her feet, and she is condemned to dance until she truly repents. Unlike the original story, in which her feet are amputated, Karen merely continues to dance until she is unable to even walk.
 The Red Shoes was adapted as a ballet by the choreographer Matthew Bourne, and premiered at Sadler's Wells Theatre London in December 2016.
 British singer-songwriter Kate Bush's seventh album, The Red Shoes, was named after Powell and Pressburger's film and Andersen's fairy tale the film is based on.
 'De rode schoentjes' is an attraction in Dutch theme park the Efteling   located inside the fairytale forest.
 The Red Shoes, a South Korean horror film inspired by the fairy tale.
 The Red Shoes is a 2013 novel by John Stewart Wynne.  It is a re-visioning of the story, set in contemporary New York City.
 "The Red Shoes" is a flamenco fairytale - a flamenco music and dance adaptation by A'lante Dance Ensemble choreographed by Olivia Chacon

See also

List of works by Hans Christian Andersen

References

External links

 The Red Shoes Jean Hersholt's English translation
 De røde sko Original Danish text
 SurLaLune's Annotated The Red Shoes
 Full text from "Andersen's Fairy Tales"
  Kneehigh Theatre
 Sky Candy
 Story with collaborative original artworks by Project Bookses

1845 short stories
Danish fairy tales
Fiction about magic
Fictional footwear
Short stories by Hans Christian Andersen